Pasig City MCW Sports is a Filipino professional basketball team representing Pasig. It was originally known as the Pasig Pirates, the Pasig Blue Pirates and the Pasig-Rizal Pirates from 1998 to 2000 in the now-defunct Metropolitan Basketball Association.

Since the 2022 MPBL Playoffs the team has been sponsored by MCW Sports, an online sports news portal in the Philippines.

Notable players

MBA
 Paul Alvarez
 Bong Ravena
 Jonathan De Guzman
 Jay Magat
 Dorian Peña
 John Dumont

MPBL
 Francis Adriano
 Matthew Aquino
 Boyet Bautista
 Nic Belasco
 Ronjay Enrile
 Josan Nimes
 Jeric Teng

Team roster

Head coaches
 James Machate (2018-2019)
 Ronjay Enrile (2019–2020)
 Bong Dela Cruz (2020–2022)
 Ogie Gumatay (2022–2023)
 Boyet Fernandez (2023–present)

Season-by-season records
Records from the 2022-23 MPBL season:

See also
 Sta. Lucia Realtors (PBA)
 Sta. Lucia Realtors (PCBL)

References

Basketball teams established in 1998
1998 establishments in the Philippines
Sports teams in Metro Manila
Maharlika Pilipinas Basketball League teams
Metropolitan Basketball Association teams